Joel Gion (born ) is an American musician, best known as the tambourine player for the psychedelic rock band The Brian Jonestown Massacre.

He was a guest star on the U.S. television show Gilmore Girls, where he played the tambourine in the fictitious band Hep Alien.

The Brian Jonestown Massacre
He appeared in the 2004 documentary Dig! along with the rest of the Brian Jonestown Massacre, and is featured prominently on the cover of the DVD of the same film. His image is also on the cover of the Brian Jonestown Massacre album Thank God For Mental Illness (and a very distended image of him can be seen on Give It Back!). He is the third longest-serving member of the Brian Jonestown Massacre, after band leader Anton Newcombe and guitarist-vocalist Matt Hollywood.

He rejoined The Brian Jonestown Massacre for their 2006 tour and still plays tambourine and maracas with the band.

Solo

In 2011 Gion released his first solo vinyl EP "Extended Play". In 2012, Gion released the single "Yes" as an advance of his upcoming solo album, which was due to be released in 2014. At the end of 2013, he formed a new group, Joel Gion & The Primary Colours, made up of Gion on guitar, percussion and vocals, Brian Jackson (guitar), Derek See (guitar and vocals), Galine Tumasova (bass, vocals), Raul Sanchez (drums), Yvonne Hernandez (percussion), and Kevin Wood (keyboards).

In 2014, Gion released a solo album named Apple Bonkers on August 18 (UK) and 19 (US). The album is co-produced by members of the Brian Jonestown Massacre, Collin Hegna and Rob Campanelle, featuring actual (Daniel Allaire and Matt Hollywood) and former (Jeffrey Davies and Miranda Lee Richards) members of the Brian Jonestown Massacre, members of the Dandy Warhols (Pete Holmstrom), Dead Skeletons (Ryan Van Kriedt) and Warlocks (Jason Anchondo). The album is mainly composed of classic 1960s sounds, with influences from shoegaze, post-punk, psychedelia, alt-country and mod/beat music.

In 2017, Gion released his eponymous titled album "Joel Gion" with a more personalized take on lounge in Psychedelia.

Joel Gion is currently writing a collective of short stories. The stories are written after the life of Dig. You can buy it on his patreon page.

Discography
 EP (2011) Goingion
 Apple Bonkers (2014) The Reverberation Appreciation Society
 Joel Gion (2017) Beyond Beyond Is Beyond Records

References

External links

Living people
American indie rock musicians
American rock percussionists
Tambourine players
The Brian Jonestown Massacre members
21st-century drummers
Year of birth missing (living people)